The Reed College campus includes academic buildings, dormitories and houses, administration and service buildings, student centers and other buildings. Academic buildings include the A. A. Knowlton Laboratory of Physics, Arthur F. Scott Laboratory of Chemistry (1992), Center for Advanced Computation, Educational Technology Center (2002), L.E. Griffin Memorial Biology Building, and Psychology Building. Buildings primarily used for the arts and performance include Kaul Auditorium, Studio Art Building, the Performing Arts Building, and Theatre Annex Building. The Annex features main stage and black box theaters with additional rooms for instruction and rehearsals, plus storage space sometimes called Reed Warehouse.

The campus features several residence halls. The Old Dorm Block was built in 1912 and features eight residence halls: Abington, Doyle, Eastport, Kerr, Ladd, Quincy, Westport and Winch. Bragdon, Chittick, Griffin, McKinley and Woodbridge Halls, known collectively as the Cross Canyon Residence Halls, are separated from the campus by Reed Canyon and are used primarily for first-year students. The group of buildings are within a grassy, wooded area; their smaller size and close proximity "foster a strong sense of community" among students. Chittick, Griffin, McKinley and Woodbridge are each named after early faculty members and house 28 residents. Bragdon Hall is the newest of the Cross Canyon dormitories, constructed in 1998. The French, German, Russian and Spanish Houses, known collectively as the Woodstock Language Houses, were designed by A. E. Doyle and built in 1922. Once used as housing for faculty, residents living in these buildings primarily converse in their respective languages and sponsor community events. The Foster and Scholz buildings, constructed during 1954–1955, were once a single residence hall for male students called Foster-Scholz. MacNaughton was built at the same time for female students. All three residence halls, named after former Reed College presidents, now serve as coed dormitories with divided double rooms. Anna Mann was originally built for female students, but is now coed. The Birchwood and Reed College Apartments offer fully furnished units and are available to students following their first year. The Garden House, acquired in 1991 and renovated in 1994, houses just ten students. Naito Hall and Sullivan Hall, built in 1997, house 160 residents and offer common areas, kitchens and views of the Tualatin Mountains. The Grove, comprising Sequoia, Bidwell, Aspen, and Sitka, was completed in 2008 and provides house-like amenities. In 2019, the Trillium residence hall was completed, located between the sports fields and the Grove.

Service buildings include 28 West, which houses offices for Community Safety and Residence Life, and the Dorothy Johansen House, a former residence of a Reed College graduate and professor that now houses the academic support services. The Health and Counseling Center, built as the Glenn Chesney Quiett Infirmary in 1938, offers health and counseling services to students. Greywood, originally constructed for a community center in Vancouver, Washington was moved to the campus in 1946. The building has served a variety of functions, but now houses the alumni and parent relations program, College Relations Information Systems (CRIS), and career services.

Other buildings include the Aubrey R. Watzek Sports Center, constructed in 1965 to replace the original gym built in 1913. The Parker House, an Arts and Crafts-style home designed by Morris H. Whitehouse in 1929 for Mary Evans Parker, was purchased by Reed College in 2005; much of its gardens, part of Florence Holmes Gerke's original design, still exist.

Buildings

Source: Reed College

See also

 List of Marylhurst University buildings
 List of Portland State University buildings
 List of University of Oregon buildings
 List of University of Portland buildings
 List of Willamette University buildings

References

External links
 Theatre floor plan, first floor (PDF)
 Theatre floor plan, second floor (PDF)
 Theatre floor plan, third floor (PDF)

Reed College
Reed College
Reed College buildings
Reed College buildings